Kross is a Polish sports industry company which specializes in manufacturing bicycles and bicycle frames. The company is currently the largest in Poland manufacturing bicycles sold in the Polish market. In 2005 the company sold almost 800,000 products, half of which were exported to 35 countries, 30 of which are in Europe.

History 
The company was founded in 1990 when Zbigniew Sosnowski opened a bike shop in Przasnysz, which soon turned into a warehouse and assembly plant for bicycles. With time, and the right investments, the company has become a thriving manufacturer of bicycles, originally sold under the Grand brand, and from 2003 - Kross. Since 2004, they also own and manufacture the Zipp brand of scooters.

In 2018, the company manufactured a total of 275,000 bicycles. In 2020 the bicycles were exported to 50 countries around the world.

Products 
The company has in its collection, several groups of bicycles designed for different applications:
 Level - mountain bikes intended for Cross-country (XC)
 Hexagon - mountain bikes intended for tourism and recreation
 XC Full - FS mountain bikes intended for Cross-country (XC)
 Vento - road bikes
 Multicycle - E-Bikes
 Le Grand - city bikes
 Inzai, Seto, Noru - urban bikes
 Trans - trekking and tourism bikes
 children bikes

Gallery

See also
Economy of Poland
List of Polish companies

References

External links
 Official site

Vehicle manufacturing companies established in 1990
Cycle manufacturers of Poland
Mountain bike manufacturers
Polish brands
Polish companies established in 1990